Nihad Mameledžija (born 27 February 1971) is a Bosnian bobsledder. He competed in the four man event at the 1998 Winter Olympics.

References

1971 births
Living people
Bosnia and Herzegovina male bobsledders
Olympic bobsledders of Bosnia and Herzegovina
Bobsledders at the 1998 Winter Olympics
Place of birth missing (living people)